Middlesex County (2016 population 71,551) is a primarily rural county in Southwestern Ontario, Canada. Landlocked, the county is bordered by Huron and Perth counties on the north, Oxford County on the east, Elgin County on the south, and Chatham-Kent and Lambton County on the west.

The county seat is the city of London, although the city is politically independent from the county. The Middlesex census division, which consists of the county together with the City of London and three First Nations reserves, had a population of 455,526 in 2016. Part of the county is also included in the London census metropolitan area.

Administrative divisions
Middlesex County is composed of eight incorporated municipalities (in order of population):

Strathroy-Caradoc, Township of
Population centres: Strathroy and Mount Brydges. Other communities: Cairngorm, Campbellvale, Caradoc, Christina, Falconbridge, Glen Oak, Longwood, Melbourne (part) and Muncey.
Middlesex Centre, Municipality of
Population centre: Ilderton. Other communities: Arva, Ballymote, Birr, Bryanston, Coldstream, Delaware, Denfield, Duncrief, Elginfield, Ettrick, Ivan, Kilworth, Komoka, Littlewood, Lobo, Lobo Siding, Maple Grove, Melrose, Poplar Hill, Sharon, Southgate, Southwold, Telfer and Vanneck.
Thames Centre, Municipality of (township)
Population centres: Dorchester and Thorndale. Other communities: Avon, Belton, Cherry Grove, Crampton, Cobble Hill, Derwent, Devizes, Evelyn, Fanshawe Lake, Friendly Corners, Gladstone, Harrietsville, Kelly Station, Mossley, Nilestown, Oliver, Plover Mills, Putnam, Salmonville, Silvermoon, Three Bridges and Wellburn. 
North Middlesex, Municipality of (township)
Population centre: Parkhill. Other communities: Ailsa Craig, Beechwood, Bornish, Bowood, Brinsley, Carlisle, Corbett, Greenway, Hungry Hollow, Lieury, Moray, Mount Carmel, Nairn, Sable, Springbank, Sylvan and West McGillivray. 
Southwest Middlesex, Municipality of (township)
Population centre: Glencoe. Other communities: Appin, Ekfrid, Lewis Corners, Macksville, Mayfair, Melbourne (part), Newbury Station, North Appin Station, North Ekfrid, North Glencoe Station, Riverside, Strathburn, Tate Corners, Wardsville and Woodgreen.
Lucan Biddulph, Township
Population centre: Lucan. Other communities: Biddulph, Clandeboye and Granton.
Adelaide Metcalfe, Township
Communities: Adelaide, Crathie, Dejong, Kerwood, Keyser, Mullifarry, Napier, Napperton, Springfield, Walkers and Wrightmans Corners.
Newbury, Village

First Nations reserves located within the Middlesex census division but separate from Middlesex County:
Chippewas of the Thames 42
Munsee-Delaware 1
Oneida 41.

History
The area was originally organized as Suffolk County, created in July 1792 by Governor Simcoe by his first proclamation issued at Kingston, which also  defined it as a constituency for the purposes of returning a member to the new Legislative Assembly of Upper Canada, and was described as having the following territory:

Simcoe toured the southwestern portion of the province's territory in early 1793 and concluded that the lower forks of the Thames would be best suited as the future site of the provincial capital.  The names London in Middlesex were considered more appropriate for this.  Suffolk County was reorganized as Middlesex County, as part of the London District, in 1798 by the Legislative Assembly of Upper Canada, consisting of the townships of London, Westminster, Dorchester, Yarmouth, Southwold, Dunwich, Aldborough and Delaware. 

Middlesex County was expanded several times thereafter, starting in 1821 with the addition of the townships of Moza, Ecfrid (sic), Carradoc (sic) and Lobo. Adelaide Township came from the Huron Tract in 1835, and Williams Township was withdrawn from Huron County and annexed to Middlesex in 1845. In 1837, Bayham and Malahide Townships were transferred to Middlesex from Norfolk County. Metcalfe Township was formed from the north part of Ekfrid and the south part of Adelaide in 1845.

Upon the abolition of the London District in January 1850, Middlesex County was constituted for municipal purposes. The County was reorganized as the United Counties of Middlesex and Elgin in 1851, with its townships divided thus:

Elgin County was separated from Middlesex in September 1853.

The townships of Biddulph and McGillivray were withdrawn from Huron County and annexed to Middlesex in 1862.

The historic townships of the County (including those originally part of Huron County marked in red) are shown below:

Withdrawal and evolution of the City of London

London, when it became a city in 1855, separated from Middlesex County, and it expanded later in stages:

Demographics 

Municipal government
Members of the County Council are the mayors (or reeves) of the municipalities of Adelaide Metcalfe, Lucan Biddulph, Middlesex Centre, North Middlesex, Southwest Middlesex, Strathroy-Caradoc and Thames Centre as well as the Village of Newbury. Centres with a population exceeding 5,000 also get an additional seat for their deputy mayors. The head of council is one of its members who is elected as reeve for a one year term by the councillors.

Labour Force 
Middlesex County has 38,231 people over the age of 15, with 45% of them working in the same municipality as the one they live in. That implies that more than 50% of them commute to other municipalities.

See also
 List of municipalities in Ontario
 List of townships in Ontario
 List of secondary schools in Ontario#Middlesex County

References

External links

 
Counties in Ontario
Southwestern Ontario